Jodie Lynn Resther (born November 28, 1977) is a Canadian actress and singer. In the 1990s she played Kiki in the children's live-action show Are You Afraid of the Dark?, and has been involved in various dramas including  Extra! Extra!, Vampire High, Undressed, and Fries With That. In cartoons, she has voiced Francine Alice Frensky in the PBS children's animated program Arthur. She voiced Tecna in the Cinélume dub of Winx Club, and also voiced in Deus Ex: Human Revolution. Besides screen and voice acting, Resther has dabbled in music, releasing an R&B album titled Real and a French-language album called Ma Dualité on the DEJA Musique label.

Filmography

Film

Television

Video games

Discography
 Real (2000, Aquarius Records)
 Ma Dualite (2006, Unidisc)

References

External links
 
 
 

1978 births
Living people
Canadian voice actresses
Black Canadian actresses
Actresses from Montreal
Canadian people of Jamaican descent
Singers from Montreal
Anglophone Quebec people
Canadian child actresses
21st-century Canadian women singers
Arthur (TV series)